The Middle River is a tributary of the Snake River in northwestern Minnesota in the United States.  It flows for its entire length in Marshall County.

Middle River was so named from its location at the midpoint of the Pembina Trail.

Course
It rises near the town of Middle River and flows generally westwardly past the towns of Newfolden and Argyle. At Old Mill State Park the river crosses an old beach of glacial Lake Agassiz. Much of the Middle River's lower course through the Red River Valley has been straightened and channelized; for approximately its final , the Middle has been routed to flow due west in a straight line. It joins the Snake River not far upstream of that river's confluence with the Red River of the North.

See also
List of Minnesota rivers
List of longest streams of Minnesota

References

External links
Old Mill State Park website

Rivers of Minnesota
Rivers of Marshall County, Minnesota
Tributaries of Hudson Bay